The Posidonia Shale (also called Schistes Bitumineux in Luxembourg) geologically known as the Sachrang Formation, is an Early Jurassic (Toarcian) geological formation of southwestern and northeast Germany, northern Switzerland, northwestern Austria, southern Luxembourg and the Netherlands, including exceptionally well-preserved complete skeletons of fossil marine fish and reptiles. The Posidonienschiefer, as German paleontologists call it, takes its name from the ubiquitous fossils of the oyster-related bivalve Posidonia bronni that characterize the mollusk faunal component of the formation.

The Posidonienschiefer, the German translation, takes its name from the ubiquitous fossils of the oyster-related bivalve "Posidonia bronni" (synonym of Bositra buchii and Steinmannia bronni) that characterize the mollusk faunal component of the formation. The name Posidonia Shale has been used for more than a century, until revisions in 2016 proposed the Sachrang Formation as new name for the Germanic unit, in a same way Altmühltal Formation is the official name of the Solnhofen Limestone. The Posidonia Shales where stablished as a valid vulgar name for this regions lower Toarcian Black Shales. The name Posidonienschiefer, while valid, represents another vulgar nomination, as Posidonia is an invalid genus and junior synonym of Bositra. The type profile is still located on Dotternhausen.

The formation comprises finely laminated layers of oil shales formed of fine-grained sediments intercalated with bituminous limestones and crops out in a number of locations in southwestern Germany, although most remains are from near the village of Holzmaden. The European oil shales deposited on a sea floor during the Early Toarcian in the ancient Tethys Ocean are described as being deposited in an anoxic, or oxygen-depleted, deep water environment, although the details of the depositional environment are the subject of debate by researchers of the formation.

The Sachrang member is among the most important formations of the Toarcian boundary in the Northern Alps realm This Sachrang member is included inside the major stratigraphic groups found on the Tirol Mountains in Central Europe, where is equivalent to the Saubach Formation, also from the Toarcian stage. It is part of the series of formations with the presence of Toarcian black shales, being among the most important of the Alpine-Mediterranean domain. Those Shales on the Northern Calcareous Alps was sedimented based on a strong dependency on the overall palaeobathymetric situation of the region, as recovered by the microfacies types as well as in the composition of the biota. The deeper part is domain of the Sachrang Shales, with a basin radiolaria-rich lithologies, and a parallel series of submarine topographic highs a dominance of echinoderm-and mollusc-biomicrites (Unken Shales) and a strong increase in resedimentation can be observed.

Geology 

The Posidonia Shale is part of the so-called Southern German Cuesta Landscape, with the strata referred to being the principal representative of the Lower Jurassic layers in the foreland area of the Swabian and Franconian Alps, where it is one of the dominant layers of the Liassic deposition. The lithology consists mostly of carbonate concretion layers, mixed with abundant pyrite and euhedral crystals. Detrital clay, with a fine grain depositional exposure forms the bulk of the Posidonia, along with the presence of silt-sized quartz, being a component found on the lower layers of the formation. The black shales are the main component of the lithology of the Posidonia Shale, with different ratio of thickness, being more exposed on the southern German realm, specially near Ohmden. Studies of the shales have shown that the rise and fall of the sea level was one of the main effect of change on the Chemofacies present on the Posidonia. Posterior changes set environments for Chlorobiaceae and antiestuarine deposition. It was deposited on the Central European Basin, whose was connected on the Toarcian period with the Proto-Athlantic realm, under the sedimentary influence of the Fennoscandian deltas & sedimentation, along with several massif deposition, such as the Renic and the Bohemian, being the main representative emerged lands on the central European margin. its characterised by and abundant content of organic matter, with a presence of an up to 16% TOC, caused by anoxic to euxinic bottom water conditions. Most of the depositional margins of the German realm were on Pelagic marine settings, where the oxygen was the object of different changes along the layers, due to climate conditions and sea current effects. Outside the Shales, there are other types of lithology present, such as the light grey marls of the Aschgraue and Blaugraue Mergel that occur at the base of the Posidonia Shale section, which are related to sea bottom environment with a large period of well and suitable oxygen conditions, reflected on the presence of organic matter. The Black Shales are the opposite, with anoxic bottom effect and a detailed negative effect on the biota. Other elements of the Formation are the presence of Pyrites on the Black Shales. The effects of the changes to oxygen and depositions have had visible effect, with diagenetic and syngenetic pyrite forms, being the second ones deposited in oxygenated or dysoxic bottom waters, with pores and effects of biotic interaction, and the diagenetic pyrite needing high contents of transition metals. The Posidonia Shale is also one of the Environments where the Methane release on the Toarcian is better exposed. Related to worldwide effects, rapid and large-scale emissions by dissociation of methane hydrate in Europe and worldwide (Related to the Karoo Volcanism) was driven by astronomical forcing superimposed and ending on a longer-term global warming.

The Jurassic sedimentation on the Sachrang member is subdivided into several different units, with drastic changes in the Northern Calcareous Alps. During the Toarcian, carbonate platforms collapsed and several types of bottom reliefs were generated due to tectonic activity, where on the submarine swells the red nodular limestones with an exposure of 20 m of the Adnet Formation were deposited on zones of basinal sedimentology, know due to the presence of grey limestone and marl on an up to 200 m layer of the Allgäu Formation. The marls of the Sachrang member are part of the Lower Toarcian "Black Shale deposition", contemporaneous of other events on central Germany and England. The Sachrang member was geologically divided in the Sachrang section, that presents typical development of a basinal area and the Unken Member, with benthic microfossils with suboxic water influence. The Toarcian Black Shale of the Sachrang member are related to the ones present on the Úrkút Manganese of Hungary, that is related with manganese ores that develop over more than 250 km distance in the Northern Calcareous Alps. All the units where vinculated to the Transdanubian Range Unit, where the Sachrang member and the Úrkút Manganese shared the paleogeographic evolution present on the southern near land margin, influenced by a continuous process of Rifting present on the Tethys Ocean. On the Hettangian the vinculated central European platforms drowned and where affected by Sinemurian-Pliensbachian tensional tectonic events along with marine sedimentation, reoriented by the emersion of horsts on the Úrkút area. The Pliensbachian basin had near 200 m depth, and the presence of slope environments, tectonically influenced basins are indicated on locations such as the Hiertlaz Limestone. The marine sedimentation and the continuous tectonic rework let some of the local basins to last until the latest Jurassic. In the Toarcian, there was a great condensation affecting the subsided highs, where ferric components were deposited. After that, tectonics, faulting and erosion on the Cretaceous change the deposition of the region.

Stratigraphy 
Is composed by various levels, starting with a lover level of basal mudstone of 4 m thick. This level is composed mainly by organic filled layers that have some hiatus, occupied by continental-derived deposition. Over the mudstone level, a series represented by the Bächental bituminous marls and a Debrite is exposed. The lower part of this section is composed of greyish marls, with abundant radiolarians, bivalves of the genus Bositra, ostracods, sponge spicules, and some Foraminifera. Samples from Unit 2 show varying microfacies. The stratification of the Bächental level presents a trend of marine to mesosaline conditions, as it was part of a depocenter at the south of the path between the Bohemian Massif & the Vindelician land. Some of the layers at that locality expose also influence of temporal hypersaline conditions on bottom waters, due to the abundance of methylsteranes, associated with Dinoflagellates or halophylic microorganisms and gammacerane. This salinity stratification might have had an impact on the presence of organic matter on the level.

Sachrang Shales 
The Sachrang Shales where cited originally on the restudy of the Alpine Upper Black Slate, composed with dark gray, somewhat sandy, disintegrating into thin but large plates of Marl. Other studies where recovering a Greenish-Gray Marl Slate levels, Black Marl limestone on the Middle Toarcian Levels, a dominant level of bituminous marl and the high presence of dark brown manganese slates. until the point that there are works that put the at Sachrang Black Shale under the name Posidonia Shale. The definition of the Sachrang Shales has been convoluted along its history of study of the location, where there are works of the North Alpine Mesozoic that prefer before calling these deposits Sachranger Shale to give it a brief different diagnosis. On the Unken Syncline near Lofen, basinal deposits with abundant Aragonite and Calcite helped to know the major Jurassic basin geometry, where on several layers of the same age was complicated due to the posterior Alpine deformation. Correlated Unken and Diessbach basins developed mostly during the Toarcian, with deposition of abundant material from the near Emerged Landmasses. On the Unken Syncline, the breccias associated with the normal faults were deposited until Oxfordian age.

Bächentaler Bitumenmergel 
The Bächental bituminous marls consists of a 24-m-thick succession of bituminous marls in the Bächental valley of Tyrol, that recovers a marginal Marine Basin, where the major Toarcian Events where recorded, with paleoenvironmental changes within the Bächental basin, as recovered by the study of Organic Matter accumulation influenced by the global (Magmatism, opening of the Alpine Atlantic Ocean) and local scales s (Basin morphology, salinity variations). There is not clear whether the Sachrang Shale includes or not all the Iithological type of the "Bächental layers", while subject to the most recent results. "Bächental layers" had recover the influence from the Hungarian Volcanic events that took place during the Lower Toarcian, as was located on the NW continental margin of the Neotethys Ocean and the SW continental margin of the Alpine Atlantic. Also, the occurrence of considerable amounts of Smectite through the entire Sachrang member suggests continuing local inputs from volcanic sources. In the Toarcian this area was located on the northwestern continental margin of the Neotethys Ocean and the southeastern of the new passive margin of the Alpine Atlantic. The Sachrang member on this Valley is dominated by the Bächental bituminous marls, with a level of 0.25-m basal Mudstone (with Quartz and clay minerals of terrigenous origin), followed by a 1.00-m-thick Debrite layer. There is also abundant charred organic material along with the Smectite that show that the volcaniclastic contribution of the sediment may have triggered the onset of OM accumulation in the Bächental basin. Smectite is also common on the other sections of the formation, suggesting continued influx of volcaniclastic material. The Toarcian Oceanic Anoxic Event is well recorded on this section, where as throughout the Mediterranean area and the northeastern West Tethys Shelf depositional conditions in general did not favor preservation of organic matter with low concentrations of Total Organic Matter. Also connects with the same age strata from the Réka Valley. Extensive bioturbation and relatively low Total Organic Content are indicative of normal-marine conditions without major perturbations of the carbon cycle during deposition of the Scheibelberg Formation and the Schrang Formation. Although several redox changes affected the depositional environment of the Bächental bituminous marls, where Suboxic to possibly short-term anoxic conditions prevailed during deposition of several of the units.

Lithology 
The Sachrang member is composed mostly by marine depositional components, where the black shales are the main part of the strata present, with a major composition of bacterial origin (as is present on the Marne di Monte Serrone). The Sachrang Shale represent blackish gray to dark brown bituminous, fine-leaved, somewhat sandy marl slate, that lies on the profile of the strata, alternated with storage light brown (max. 4 mm) and darker layers (rarely over 2 mm) characteristic. The lighter layers present in the rock get darker while it keeps its fine-plate character. The Shale has a Dark-Gray to brownish tone, alternated with more rarely light gray shades. There is a relatively common presence of blue fittings, as well as Wood and Fish remains (Bones, scales). The younger strata with the fresh outcrops develops on a series of several meters thick wall, that splits into fine paper Slates when weathered. The Slate is among the most common mineral on the strata, with an average lime content of 40.2%, where maximum values are at 58% and minimum values at 26%. Bituminous Claystones are present in the Edge facies of the Sachrang Shale (="Unken Shales"), with green Clay march engagements. There is not clear separation between "Manganese Shale" and "Bituminous shale" in the main localities of the formation, because the Bituminous content fluctuates with the manganese contents, that is always high. The Unken Shales on the Bächental locality is layered on 
a major Silicate component of the 60% with a pronounced dominance of Illite, along with a significant amount of Montmorillonite. The presence of Quartz and Calcite is relative with other locations of the same region from also the Toarcian, while the Pyrite content is also consistently high. Finally, the Unken Shale samples also show minor levels of Dolomite and Feldspar. There is a great abundance of Foraminiferans and Coccoliths.
Dinoflagellates are the major organic component and the most abundant microfossils. Manganese is present, such as in the Toarcian deposits of Hungary. The formation has a laminate Shale horizon associated with the Manganese Ores, with a transition of siliceous limestones and marls to black shales. Those are completed by the marl levels, composed by lithoclasts. quartz and smectite are the main minerals, along with illite, chlorite, and plagioclase in minor amounts. Bächental bituminous marls consist mainly of quartz and carbonate minerals. Isorenieratene derivatives are highly abundant on this level, related to several processes such as sedimentary iron, influenced by anoxic conditions. Rhodochrosite and manganese rich calcite are present in the manganese levels, while the Black Shale levels are rich in Pirite. The lower matrix is composed by clay and carbonate minerals, such as muscovite and feldspar. The presence of altered Celadonite, suggest volcanogenic solutions as the most probable source, where the high amounts of dissolved manganese of continental origin was translated to the epicontinental margins of the Tethys. On the Bächental bituminous marls had a bulk mineralogy where the Calcite is the most abundant fraction (49%), followed by Phyllosilicates (35%), Quartz (11%) and Pyrite (5%). While the Clay mineral distribution includes a large amount of Illite (51%), Montmorillonite (40%) and Kaolinite (9%).

Manganschiefer 
The so-called "Manganschiefer" recovers a great part of the Toarcian Bavaric Nappe, being a series of deposits with dominant Magnese Shale, that preserved different kind of fossils, from Ammonites to Fish. The deposits of nodule formation to submarine volcanism present on the "Manganschiefer" are related with occurrences on Sicily. The local manganese mineralization is constituted predominantly of carbonate mineral phases, being the two main A Magnesium-poor paragenesis with association with Calcite, with or without Dolomite, alternated with a Mn-rich one with high presence of calcite, along with Kutnahorite, and Carbon rich Rhodochrosite. Associated, there is a series of second manganese minerals such as Pyrolusite, Manganite, and a lesser presence of Birnessite and Todorokite, that appear in Rhodochrosite-dominated samples. On several places a manganese ore horizon goes up to a 1 m, for example on Pürzlbach to the Kallbrunnalm. At Salzburg there is an horizon made of solid Manganese ore along a deposited few dm of polymictic and poorly sorted breccia. The breccia is composed by angular fragments of at least 7 cm large of manganese Schist and Manganese ore, but also Dachstein Limestone pebbles. The Dachstein limestone blocks are composed of masses of ammonites and up to several cm in size crinoids, that are Fe/M impregnated. Other biota include abundant echinoderm remains. Finally, on the Dachstein limestone in the form of a poorly washed out Pelparites follows first a few mm thick, possibly due to cyanobacteria, precipitated Fe/Mn crust. The Manganschiefer on the Sachrang member consists of the lower part with gray to beige-gray Marl; fine laminated marl, partly with Pyrite and manganese minerals; dark gray, carbonate Siltstones, partly ransacked; alternating reddish and yellowish Laminites, insignificant; fine-grained layers of Breccia;Slumping horizons. The in depth mineralogy revealed that along the manganese oxides of a thin weathering crust (Pyrolusite and Todorokite) there are carbonates (system  –  –  – ) and small amounts of the silicate Braunite (syngenetic Braunite, that is directly related to warm or hot waters). The local manganese minerals are characteristically associated with several Iron minerals. Rhodochrosite, Siderite, Chamosite along with sulfides, mainly Pyrite and rarely Marcasite, are abundant in the manganese-poor black shale facies, alternating with minor content of Chalcopyrite.

Dating 

According to sedimentologic and palynologic features, a tidally influenced transgressive development within the Lower Toarcian is inferred. It is the reference formation for this interval. The Posidonia Shale of Dotternhausen and Schesslitz is well dated on the basis of ammonite and microfossil biostratigraphy. The Lower Toarcian sections are subdivided into three ammonite biozones (Dactyloceras tenuicostatum, Harpoceras falciferum, and Hildoceras bifrons) and several subzones. The Posidonia Shale is considered to be the reference formation for the Lower Toarcian section. On the other hand, Black shale formation in the Toarcian of NW Germany is associated with a major turnover in phytoplankton assemblages interpreted as the response to lowered salinities in surface waters of the epicontinental sea. The presence of the Turnover is essential for the datation and the preservation of the fauna of the formation, with detailed index ammonites preserved. The study of the different layers and strata of the Posidonia Shale has given different data about the chronology of the formation. Dormettingen shales have been calculated biochronologically and with isochron data, giving and approximate age of 183.0 million years old, being close to the Pliensbachian boundary based on the recent revisions of the Early Jurassic Subperiods. The Toarcian and the Pliensbachian are considered as strongly constrained in terms of chronology, although that doesn't imply that all the formations labelled to one of the two periods have to be limited; for example Lithuanian Neringa Formation whose upper strata matches with the lowermost Toarcian (183.0). The rich Shale of the foreland area of the Swabian and Franconian Alb have been recovered as part of the Posidonia, with samples that expose an age between 183.0 and 181.1, thus recovering the Lower Toarcian strata. Although the east margin of the formation has yield strata with an age of 179.7 m.a, showing the presence of the depositional environment in Middle Toarcian times.

History 
The Posidonia Shale has been a focus of scientific interest for the last 100 years. The first fossils were recorded in 1598 by the medical doctor Johannes Bauhin, who interpreted the local ammonites as “metallic things” in rocks and as “miraculous tricks” of nature, while the crinoids where interpreted as either huge flowers or heads of medusa, and evidencie of the biblical flood.  Many people did important geological and paleontological research on the Swabian Posidonia Shale, including Carl Hartwig von Zieten (1785–1846), Eberhard Fraas (1862–1915), Bernhard Hauff senior (1866–1950) and Adolf Seilacher (1925–2014).

1800s 

The first related studies with the Posidonia Shale Strata were done in the early 1800s. At first, the Formation was not identified as a separated unit. The first fossils were recovered on several Collections, some since the Modern Age, present on localities like the pits near the Banz Abbey. Among the oldest examples of fossils found on the formation is included the crocodylomorph Steneosaurus in 1824, but being identified as a Gharial. It was in the 1820s when major studies of the fossil finds were done. Boué in 1829 did a study of the general geology of the Jurassic along Germany, recovering limestone and shale facies, with a superficial assignation of what he considered most of the main Jurassic Strata, without classifying the layers on a concrete subperiod. And in 1830 the pterosaur Dorygnathus was described, being the first one from the Formation. In the 1830–40s, more works were done, becoming more concrete a recovering different data, setting the first assignations for the Lias & Dogger strata along Germany. Buch did a large study about the evolution of the Jurassic on the German realm, identified that most of the layers were associated with marine facies and sedimentation, interpreting a change of the emerged lands, with epicontinental deposits on the Southern German Realm. The found facies were compared with ones from the Baltic Sea deposits. The Posidonienschiefer and the Black Jurassic facies were recovered on an 1837 work that studied the deposition on the Rhenish Transitional Mountains, although it was left as a group of strata related to Lias-Dogger transition. A second edition recovered that the facies were similar to those deposited on tropical settings, like Tanzania & other similar settings, especially on near fluvial deposits. Quenstedt did a major recompilation of the Jurassic in 1843 focused on Würtemberg, covering the Black Shales and the Black Jura as only Liassic in age. The first insight on the flora was done in 1845, with partial leaf fragments. After that, several works were done searching on the Posidonienschiefer, such as Roemer in 1844, returning to the Rhenish Transitional mountains, with the previous works revisited, with a mineral research study for the Posidonia Layers. That was complemented with paleontological studies along other parts, such as Thuringia. The fish genus Lepidotes was recovered on various layers assigned to the Black Jura, being the first main fish genus identified related to the strata. After 1850, the number of studies grew, from general studies recovering the petrology, comparing it to other deposits found several parts of Germany petrified small animals, composition in terms of minerals present, chemistry of the process recovered on the strata, applications for the mineralogical industry, the Foraminiferans present on marine rocks with its affinities and ecological implications, the Crinoids associated to rafting woods, resemblances with the other liassic strata know on central Europe and implications for the general lias sedimentology or for the geology and sedimentology respect to other units along Germany. with research on North Germany, where new deposits were found. And finally, recompilations of the previous discoveries along the last decades, compared to the finds on new pits and its layers.

1900s 

While there are paleontological works since 1880, the formation itself gets a deeper view on the 1900s. One of the first main discoveries at the start of the century was the description of the ichthyosaur Stenopterygius in 1904. With also renovated data about the different minerals present of the rocks of the formation. The changes on the deposits of the formation where also recovered, where the thickness changes from North to South deposits become know, and was vinculated mostly to influence of the Glacial erratics. The influence of the Cuaternary events on the strata was compared and proved on latter studies. On 1921, Hauff do the main research of the 
found fossils from Holzmaden on the previous decades, finding exquisite specimens, some of them nearly complete, including Ammonites, Fish and Marine reptiles, such as Plesiosaurs and Icthyosaurs. It also recovered that the chemology and know most of the sedimentation of the formation was marine, with pelagic fauna, influenced by marginal marine to deep basin deposits. All with the implications for the Industry, updated from previous works. Hauff described in 1938 "Acidorhynchus" (Saurorhynchus), the latest surviving of the Saurichthyiformes. The stratigraphical works were done after 1930 to corroborate the Pelagic affinities of the locations, along with comparations with other Middle and Late Juarssic deposits. As a result of those works on the strata, organic substances, related to carbonate particles, where found and studied on the late '40s. Also fragments of metallic particles where studied. The Posidonienschiefer was studied after the 60s focusing on some points bituminous shales, and the nature of them, due to the finds on the '30s–'50s. The study of the Shales led to recover data and compare to similar settings to the objective of find similar sedimentation settings, being found that the Pelagic deposits where influenced by changes on the Oxygen composition, that led to decrease the presence of scavengers, and let excepcional preservation of vertebrates and invertebrates to happen. On 1978, Wild described the First and only know Dinosaur Fossil from the formation, what he named Ohmdenosaurus, a small sized Sauropod. As the setting and the importance of the Oxygen levels get important to study the ecological boundary of the formation, new data was provided to expose the influence of the deposits, the fauna, minerals, and other components. The Ecological perspective of the formation had change, being seen as a Stagnant Basin Model, influenced by paleocurrents from the North and the South of the Central European Basin. The newest studies of the Black Shale recovered that its formation was related to anoxic changes, with temporal changes on the fauna, led by the oxygen levels. Due to that, the major fossil collections where re-observed, looking for traces of the new discovered data about the Shale.
 Also proliferate works recovering all the history of the formation, the previous studies and the changes seeing trought the reexamination, with a retrospective of the new knowledge about the changes on the deposition. That included the revision of older specimens, and historical finds on the formation.

2000s 

Recent work has recorded and rewritten data from previous works, and focused more on the appearance of the environment and the study of earlier found specimens, distribution of the sediments and its implication to the Sea currents during the Toarcian. New Flora Fragments where reported from the layers near Holzmaden and along the strata on the seashore sections on the Bohemian region, implying terrestrial deposits nearby. The Hauff Museum, where most of the specimens were housed, was revisited for the study of some of the forgotten fossils on the collection. The Black Shales were recovered has biomarkers for the lower Toarcian subperiod of the Lower Jurassic, based on foramifera and algae microfossils. Using Gamma-Ray measurements was found the deposition started on the lowermost Toarcian stage, around 182.5 million years ago, where on some pits the lower layers start with the presence of index Ammonites and Bivalves. Along with the data and the North German Facies, where recovered new Facies on Austria and the Netherlands. The main works referred to the sedimentation where done on relationship with the Toarcian Anoxic Event. The nannofacies show that the anoxic changes where the main reference to follow to see the changes on the bottom of the seas along the Toarcian Boundary, being discovered irregularities along the different regions of the Posidonia Shale. That find also that the deposition of the Shales was restricted on some parts of the formation, what led to changes on the currents, and thus influenced the different stratification on series of layers. Also, Posidonia Shale was present on abundant works relating the impact of the Anoxic event with other formations of same age. Or even changes of the behaviour of the fauna. The most recent finds have been related to old specimens, where fossil Icthyosaurs have reported preserved skin or pathologies. Also the recover of considered synonymous taxa, such as Mystriosaurus.

Paleogeography 

The Posidonia Shale was a mostly marine unit, influenced by various highs and emerged lands that provided most of the terrestrial matter found along the Formation. The Main structure of the formation was disposed along the modern southern Germany, recovering the locations of Holzmaden, Ohmden, with Niedersachsen facies at the north, and others appearing along the east, such as the related to the Banz Abbey strata or the near-Bohemia facies. The Formation was divided into various sections, including the Southwest German Basin, the main unit, where the most detailed fossils have been found, including the Icthyosaurus and Plesiosaurs housed at the Hauff Museum. The SW German Basin was a pelagic deposit, with the influence of open sea currents from the North and the South, with an estimated water depth of 500 m to 1.5 km. Abyssal depression sedimentation has not been found for now. Connected to the SW German basin where the Paris Basin, that recovered central France, with correlated sedimentation to the Shale deposition on Germany. The Paris Basin was also mostly a Pelagic to open-shelf deposit, without a major abyssal sedimentation. At the North, the Wenzen Well provide a deeper basinal setting for facies coming from the main continental land present anywhere nearby the formation, Fennoscandia. The main terrestrial units present along the main Posidonia Body, where the Rhenish High at the west, being a small land of the size of Sicily, and on the east, the Bohemian Massif with the Vindelician High, the major units present on the Central European basin on the Toarcian. The Topography of the Massif is believed to be hereditary of the Paleozoic Transgressions that happened on the central European margin, with possible elevated facies, where the major topographical accidents would be situated along the southern coast. The Vindelician Land/High has been represented as a peninsula to the Bohemian Massif, or an isolated landmass, that is due to its connections that had not been recovered in depth, being considered a mostly plain emerged sedimentary structure. Finally, the southernmost part of the Formation, the Bern High (Allemanic Swell) recovered the modern north of Switzerland, a small terrestrial setting with similar conditions to Sardinia. Out of the main basin, the layers of the formation extend to the Danish Central Graben, that deposited on the Baltic coast of Germany and Denmark. The Danish Central Graben was a depositional shelf basin, with depths around 1–2 km maximum, with abundant facies related to Volcanic deposits, coming mostly from the southern Fennoscandia Central Skåne Volcanic Province. The extension of the Facies of the Posidonia Shale come near the London-Brabant Massif, with a similar topography to modern Creta. At the northern shores of the Massif was present the West Netherlands Basin, a seashore to epicontinental deposit, with abundant terrestrial facies.

Oil 

Recent studies have shown that the petroleum generation potential of the PS is high in all studied regions due to the high TOC and Hydrogen Index. However, differences exist which can be expressed by SPI values. The latter are highest for northern Germany, where the PS is richest in TOC and has the highest HI values combined with a thickness of 30 to 40 m at most places. Since the first serious evaluations in the 2000s, different organic samples were extracted to revise the changes and potential presence of the Shale Oil on the main quarries of the southern realm. Based on several core samples with abundant organic material (Dinoflagellate cysts and other microorganism fragments, such as microscopic algae) different thermal maturity has been found, especially on the samples from the Hils Syncline strata. The maturation of this strata has implied losing organic carbon and loss of hydrogen index values. Beyond that, the status of the samples has been stable during at least 40 measured years.

Ecology 

The Lower Toarcian is characterized by the widespread occurrence of organic-rich mudstones, termed black shales, in western Europe and other parts of the world. It is considered to represent mostly marine units, including Pelagic, epicontinental and on a more less presence, deltaic and seashore environments. Near Shore sections are filled with algal fragments and pollen, that suggest interceded dunar environments with proximal water and Halophile flora, and probably water flooded forests. Most of the fossilized environments are open sea and marine settings, with abundance of shells and coral fragments. The relation between the sea environments and the less present terrestrial match with the paleogeography of the Lower Toarcian of Europe, where a main sea covered most part of the modern countries, with emerged lands such as the Amoricanian Massif or the Bohemian Massif.

Marine environments 
The early Toarcian stage was characterized with the presence of a general deposition of mudrocks along with organic matter mostly on marine strata, showed by different kind of succession in marine strata, that can be observed nowadays worldwide. The Black shales present in the Posidonia Formation are related to deposits present on Lithuania, Canada and several other countries & Continents. This suggests the presence of a general deposition of organic matter, driven by several global events and changes present on the surface. This caused changes on the bottom of the seas, with abundant deposition of organic matter. It is related to a change in carbon-isotope excursion in marine and terrestrial life, and was probably a perturbator of the carbon cycle. Global seawater has been proved to be approximately,  for the interval of the negative carbon-isotope excursion, close to 1.45‰, less than modern values, with estimated 2.34‰. Waters interchange were one of the major effects on the palatine de-oxygenation showed on most of the Lower Toarcian Layers around the word, with the connection with the Viking Corridor as one of the main effects, due to the arctic waters freshening and breaking the oceanic circulation. The effect was consequently negative on the German realm, where the environments expose a tropical fluctuation, with conditions similar to the modern Caribbean Sea, which hosted a high variety of sea fauna, except on the bottom layers, where only a few genera were able to survive when oxygen conditions get slightly better. The changes on the bottom floor oxygen where common, with most of the animals dying without being scavenged by bottom-dweller organisms, and sessile life (Except some Polychaetans on higher oxygen conditions). Posterior facies of the middle Toarcian show changes on the Environments, getting more oxygen and different depositional settings with the presence of trace fossils such as Chondrites and Phymatoderma granulata, surfacing deposit-feeding animals, being adapted for effective nutrient searching, becoming more common on the uppermost layers. The sea levels where transgressive, as it is shown on layers across Bavaria where major events set the fate of the nearshore environments. One example is the case of the Monotis–Dactylioceras beds, that had an extent of +500 km, that has been linked with a possible Tsunami. There is not major indicative of synsedimentary faulting in South Germany, but is present on the western Tethyan Shelf, with breccias created from earthquakes, present on Toarcian levels of the Austrian Adnet Formation. It would start as an initial wave propagation affecting the Altdorf High aiming for the south, where it would have hitten the shoreline of the Bohemian Island.

Terrestrial environments 
The main Terrestrial environments of the Posidonia Shale are the near emerged lands where the Black Forest High (know thanks to strata containing fine sand in the tenuicostatum Zone, ‘Glaukonit und viel Feinsand’, at Obereggenen im Breisgau), located at 70 km at the west and the Vosges Massif (know by the abundant detrital quartz from the EST433 borehole located near Bure, Meuse).  Mostly of this lands where of Paleozoic origin, from the London-Brabant Massif at the west, the French Central Massif at the south, the Vindelician High and Bohemian Massif at the east, with minor lands present whose emerged nature on the Toarcian is controversial, including the Vlotho Massif at the northwest, the Swedish Bern high at the south, Rhenish Massif on the Center and the Fuenen High in the north. The Fennoscandian province was the major continental realm, that provide most of the freshwater for the nearshore environments. The Bern high was characterised with being one of the southernmost environments on the formation, with a terrestrial setting characterised by tropical climate, with the presence of enhanced rainfall and river freshwater inputs together with recurrent discharges of northern waters. Is compared with a modern Bahamian setting, with relative humid flora and the presence of abundant rivers, although it is believed to have a more vertical topography. The Vlotho Massif is one of the most interesting cases on the realm, being capable of generate a thermal influence on nearshore waters. With a high deposition of metals, the layers of the High show instead a climate varied between 21° to 26° and a more dry climate, being a Mediterranean climate zone. Same is applied to the Bohemian Shores, populated by large Araucarian and Cycadales. The Environments were influenced by monsoonal conditions, and large scale rains that hit most of the nearshore settings, causing the large accumulation of Insect remains found on the epicontinental layers. Southern summers with humid south-west monsoonal conditions occur on most of the emerged lands, getting a winter with dry north east trade winds. Those were related to the seasonal occurrence of wood rafts on the formation and linked to the life cycle of the stem crinoids. On the land, probably where the main source of seeds and help to interchange species between landmasses.

Micropaleontology
In Austria, the Unken Member of the Formation Recovers Deep Basinal Deposits, while the Salzburg member is related with Epicontinental to Shallow Nearshore Waters. On the After the Pliensbachian-Toarcian locally is observed a significant decrease in the Crinoid skeleton elements, also that of the Ophiurida; the Echinoids take their place, where really blossomed at that time. Pedicellaria are observed very often. On the Bächental bituminous marls there is a great abundance of saturated Hydrocarbons in the hexanesoluble fraction. Methyl and Methylene where found along long-chain paraffinic molecules (n-alkanes). Benzenemethanol resins are especially strong for the Benzene-Methanol fraction. While the occurrence of charred Organic Matter is commonly connected to Wildfire activity, the presence of Alginite as the dominant maceral group in Bächental bituminous marls suggests a mainly marine algal source. The main maceral found is Lamalginite, which may derive from thin-walled planktonic and benthic organisms, including Green Algae, Cyanobacteria, and Bacterial mats. There is a clear low frequency of Vitrinite and Inertinite, what suggests that terrestrial inputs of organic matter to be of less importance, although, the main part of OM contained in the basal mudstone, including charred material, was derived from terrestrial sources. This Mudstone contains charred organic material typically connected to Wildfires along with large amounts of expandable Smectite possibly derived from alteration of volcanic ash, what indicated a clear contribution of volcanic-derived detritus during deposition of the Bächental bituminous marls, whose genesis was probably linked to the rift history of the Valais,  and Piemonte-Liguria domains (Sinemurian-Callovian), and the Toarcian break-up of the Ligurian-Penninic oceanic realm. There is measurements of reduction of the local salinity on the water where elevated inputs of freshwater due to an accelerated hydrological cycle resulted in a surface-water layer.

Paleontological significance 

In addition to their Posidonia bronni, the shales contain some spectacularly detailed fossils of other Jurassic sea creatures—ichthyosaurs, and plesiosaurs, spiral-shelled ammonites and crinoids, or sea-lilies. The best-preserved fossils found on the Early Jurassic can be the ones from the Posidonia Shale. There are also abundant fish fossils (including genera such as Pachycormus, Ohmdenia, Strongylosteus and chondrichthyes like Hybodus or Palaeospinax). Most of the fauna is marine, with several terrestrial specimens, and some of them being semiaquatic, such as the sphenodont Palaeopleurosaurus.

Flora has been found, especially the genus Xenoxylon, but also Otozamites, Equisetites and Pagiophyllum.

Urweltmuseum Hauff 
The Main Museum with the taxa Found on the Posidonia Shale, the Hauff Museum recovers the best specimens found in the last 150 years, and it is situated on Ohmden. With different expositions, the museum has several spaces for the marine fauna, where it is exposed, including a disposed strata with the layer showing the provenance of every taxon and its fossil. The Museum has been working since the 1900s, and was founded by Bernhard Hauff, using his private collection of fossils as a base, as an opposite to Alwin Hauff who wanted to use the layers for industrial production. The Museum was reformed on between the years 1967–71. On the year 2000, an external park with Dinosaur models was added. The museum has several halls with different kinds of fauna found on the layers of the formation, where the vertebrate specimens are exposed on the main parts, including on those Icthyosaur remains and several fishes. The Museum has the world's largest colony of sea lilies, measuring an approximate size of 100 square metres. Rolf Bernhard Hauff is the actual director of the museum.

Gallery

See also 
 List of fossiliferous stratigraphic units in Germany
 Toarcian turnover
 Toarcian formations
Marne di Monte Serrone, Italy
 Calcare di Sogno, Italy
 Mizur Formation, North Caucasus
 Saubach Formation, Austria
 Úrkút Manganese Ore Formation, Hungary
 Irlbach Sandstone, Germany
 Ciechocinek Formation, Germany and Poland
 Krempachy Marl Formation, Poland and Slovakia
 Djupadal Formation, Central Skane
 Lava Formation, Lithuania
 Azilal Group, North Africa
 Whitby Mudstone, England
 Fernie Formation, Alberta and British Columbia
 Poker Chip Shale
 Whiteaves Formation, British Columbia
 Navajo Sandstone, Utah
 Los Molles Formation, Argentina
 Mawson Formation, Antarctica
 Kandreho Formation, Madagascar
 Kota Formation, India
 Cattamarra Coal Measures, Australia

References

External links 
 Images of fossils in the Urwelt-Museum Hauff (Holzmaden)

 
Geologic formations of the Czech Republic
Geologic formations of Germany
Geologic formations of the Netherlands
Geologic formations of Switzerland
Jurassic System of Europe
Jurassic Germany
Shale formations
Open marine deposits
Source rock formations
Fossiliferous stratigraphic units of Europe
Paleontology in Germany